Rheba de Tornyay (April 17, 1926 - September 27, 2013) was a nurse. She was named in the Living Legends of the American Academy of Nursing in 1995.

She was a pioneering dean who in 1984 took the University of Washington’s School of Nursing to a No. 1 U.S. News & World Report ranking, where it has stayed ever since.

De Tornyay served as dean of the UCLA School of Nursing from 1971 to 1975.

References

1926 births
2013 deaths
UCLA School of Nursing faculty

University of Washington faculty
Nursing educators
Members of the National Academy of Medicine